Speed skating at the 2018 Winter Olympics was held at the Gangneung Oval in Gangneung, South Korea between 10 and 24 February 2018.

Qualification

A total quota of 180 athletes were allowed to compete at the Games (maximum 100 men and 80 women). Countries were assigned quotas based on the results of the entire 2017–18 ISU Speed Skating World Cup in the autumn of 2017. Each nation was permitted to enter a maximum of three athletes per gender for all events apart from the 5000m, 10,000m and mass start events, for which they could enter a maximum of two athletes per event.

Competition schedule
The following was the competition schedule for all speed skating events. With the exception of the Team pursuit events, all rounds of each event were concluded within a single session.

All times are (UTC+9).

Medal summary

Medal table

Men's events

Women's events

Skaters who did not participate in the final of the team pursuit event, but received medals as part of the team, having taken part in an earlier round.

Records

World & Olympic records

Eight Olympic records (OR) and five Sea level world bests (WB) were set during the competition.

Other records
The Netherlands won the gold, silver and bronze medals in the women's 3000m event, making it a Dutch podium sweep.

Participating nations
A total of 184 athletes from 29 nations (including the IOC's designation of Olympic Athletes from Russia) were scheduled to participate (the numbers of athletes are shown in parentheses). Colombia was scheduled to make its debut in the sport. A record number of nations qualified to compete in these games, with the previous high being 25 at the 1998 Winter Olympics.

References

External links
Official Results Book – Speed Skating

 
2018
Winter Olympics
2018 Winter Olympics events
Olympics, 2018